The Battle of Kobylanka, one of many skirmishes of the January Uprising, took place on May 1 and May 6, 1863, in the Kobylanka Forest, located near the village of Borowiec, which at that time belonged to Russian-controlled Congress Poland. A Polish insurgent party of some 800, under Antoni Jezioranski, clashed here with a 1000-strong unit of the Imperial Russian Army.

On April 28, an insurgent party from Galicia, commanded by General Jasinski crossed Austrian/Russian border near the village of Ruda Rozaniecka. Russian Army Colonel Georgi Mednikov, who was military commandant of Janow Lubelski County, decided to send a detachment towards Ruda. Altogether, the Russian unit consisted of 1000 soldiers, including infantry, uhlans, Cossacks, border guards and two cannons.

On May 1, the Russians, led by Major Ivan Sternberg, attacked Jasinski and his men. The insurgents were well-armed, but did not have enough ammunition. Russian attack was halted by the Poles, and Sternberg ordered a retreat to Borowe Mlyny. There, his forces were strengthened with four infantry companies and other units, and as a result, Russian detachment had 2000 soldiers. Jezioranski also reinforced his party, with two cavalry battalions and rebels from the unit of Marcin Borelowski. Nevertheless, the Russians still had a 3 to 1 advantage.

On May 6, the Russians attacked insurgent camp, pushing the insurgents towards its center. After a fierce battle, in which Poles used bayonets, the Russians were pushed back by the afternoon. Altogether, Poles lost 150 men (killed and wounded). Among those killed were Jezioranski himself. Russians losses are unknown, Colonel Mednikov later reported 150 killed, but this number was probably much higher.

Sources 
 Stefan Kieniewicz: Powstanie styczniowe. Warszawa: Państwowe Wydawnictwo Naukowe, 1983. .

Kobylanka
1863 in Poland
Kobylanka
May 1863 events